Cliff Cave Park is a park located in St. Louis County, Missouri. The park is owned and administered by the St. Louis County Department of Parks and Recreation. The park is located alongside the Mississippi River.

History 
The park is named after a cave called "Cliff Cave" (originally called "Indian Cave"). The site was used as a tavern for fur trappers and traders in the 1800s, with the cave itself serving as a beer cellar. In the 1800s, the park was a recreation spot for soldiers stationed at Jefferson Barracks (which is now a museum and park).

The site was purchased by the county in 1969, using funds from a bond issue. The park opened in 1977. In 1986 the park was declared a "Heritage Park" after a referendum. This limits the amount of development that is allowed on the park site. 

The cave itself was closed to the public in 2009 to preserve both the historical artifacts inside and a population of an endangered species of bat (the Indiana Bat) which lives in the cave.

Amenities 
Fishing is possible on the park site as it borders the Mississippi River. The park also contains a shelter on the river that is reservable. The shelter has a restroom.

Trails 
The park includes four trails:

 Spring Valley Trail (1.8 miles)
 Mississippi Greenway Trail (7.1 miles)
 Spring Valley Trail Inner Loop (1.2 miles)
 River Bluff Trail (1 mile)

30-30 Hikes and 10-10 Bikes 
St. Louis County has designated 30 hiking trails that each take approximately 30 minutes to complete (30-30 hikes). One of these trails is in the park. Similarly, the park also contains one of the county's 10-10 bike trails (10 trails, each 10 miles long).

References 

Parks in Missouri